Violet Louise Wilkey (January 10, 1903 – June 5, 1976) was an American child actress who appeared in 18 films over a four-year period during the silent film era.

Career
Violet Wilkey was born in St. Louis, Missouri to an English father named Arthur Wilkey and an American mother named Anna Dora Wilkey (née Winter). Violet made her motion picture debut at the age of 10 in a 1913 dramatic short entitled The Little Mother opposite actress Ruth Stonehouse. Her follow-up film would be 1914 release The Old Maid opposite such popular stars of the era as Blanche Sweet, Spottiswoode Aitken, Mary Alden and Jack Conway.

She is possibly best remembered for her appearance as a young Flora in D. W. Griffith's controversial 1915 classic The Birth of a Nation. Wilkey portrayed the character Flora Cameron as a child in flashback scenes; the character of Flora as an adult in the film was portrayed by actress Mae Marsh.

Wilkey spent the next few years in relatively minor roles; including one of actor/director Tod Browning's early efforts The Burned Hand from 1915. Other notable films of the period were the Lloyd Ingraham directed and Anita Loos penned drama The Children Pay (1916), opposite Lillian Gish and Alma Rubens and the 1917 drama Cheerful Givers opposite Bessie Love, Aitken, Kenneth Harlan and Pauline Starke.

Wilkey's final film performance was in the role of Minnie Smellie in the 1917 comedy-drama Rebecca of Sunnybrook Farm, which was directed by Marshall Neilan and starred Mary Pickford in the title role. She retired from acting shortly thereafter at the age of 14.

Personal life
Wilkey married Russell Gilbert Kauffmann on January 27, 1927 and the couple had two children, Robert Russell and Patricia.  The marriage ended in divorce.

Filmography

References

External links

The Birth of A Nation
Young Hollywood Hall of Fame

1903 births
1976 deaths
20th-century American actresses
Actresses from St. Louis
American child actresses
American film actresses
American people of English descent
American silent film actresses